CJJJ-FM is the call sign of a campus radio station operating in Brandon, Manitoba, Canada. CJJJ operates at 106.5 MHz with an effective radiated power of 930 watts. Although predominantly alternative, CJJJ also features jazz, folk, classical, worldbeat, heavy metal, punk, Christian music and more.

History
CJJJ officially launched in September 2003. Since then it has become the community voice of Assiniboine Community College. Students and community volunteers are the main voices of this radio station.

In addition to the music, CJJJ also offers a variety of sports call-in shows, documentaries, and local multicultural shows.

External links
CJ 106
 
CRTC Broadcasting Decision 2002-422

Jjj
Jjj
Radio stations established in 2003
2003 establishments in Manitoba